Margaret Rock (7 July 1903 –  26 August 1983) was one of the 8000 women mathematicians who worked in Bletchley Park during World War II. With her maths skills and education, Rock was able to decode the Enigma Machine against the German Army. Her work during the war was classified by the Official Secrets Act 1939, so much of her work was not revealed during her lifetime.

Early life 
Rock was born and raised in Hammersmith, London to parents of Frank Ernest Rock and Alice Margaret Simmonds. Rock attended Edmonton elementary and North Middlesex School. Rock's father served in the Royal Navy as a surgeon  between 1894 and 1896 while her mother took care of her and her brother. Frank Rock would send letters to his children frequently, to stay in communication in 1914, just before World War I.

In 1917, Margaret, her mother and brother settled in Portsmouth, London, after moving frequently for three years. Rock attended Portsmouth High School, an all female private boarding school. Her father died when HMS Laurentic sank off the coast of Ireland having struck two mines laid by a German U-boat. Rock was encouraged by the letters her late father wrote to her, telling her to keep up with her studies and to be successful in the future. Her brother, John Frank Rock, became a Lieutenant in the Royal Engineers.

Education 
Rock passed the London General School Exam in June 1919. During high school, she received honours in the classes of French, mathematics, and music. Rock went to Bedford College, University of London, to earn a Bachelors of Arts Degree in 1921.

After college, Rock was employed as a statistician by the National Association of Manufacturers (The Federation of British Industry). Rock predicted the economic market and how different businesses and companies would respond to the market. In her free time, Margaret and her brother would travel to different countries such as Italy, France, Switzerland, and Sri Lanka.

World War II
In the beginning of World War II, Rock and her mother evacuated London to Cranleigh, Surrey. Margaret quit her old job, wanting a career in a time when the woman's role was primarily to be the wife and stay-at-home mother. She was then recruited for a new job at Bletchley Park on 15 April 1940. She worked for Admiral Sir Hugh Sinclair, who was the Head of Government Code and Cypher School and Secret Intelligence Service. She trained and worked alongside mathematicians and professors to break and decode enemy messages with the Enigma machine. Margaret went to work for Alfred Dilwyn Knox, where Margaret worked closely with Mavis Lever on the same projects. While working for Dilwyn Knox she became the most senior cryptographer. Knox employed women, because he believed they had great skill with cryptography work. Margaret Rock on August 1940, was considered by Dilwyn Knox to be the 4th or 5th best in the whole Enigma staff. She specialized in German and Russian code breaking. Code breaking was used to verify which individuals in the war were double agents that would skew information and present them as truth.

German Military thought that the Enigma cipher was unbreakable because of the difficult codes it would produce every day. The Enigma Machine was not coding fast enough, thus a new device was needed to win the war. By her hard work, Rock was ranked one of the better workers on the Enigma Machine project, and was promoted to seniority and a higher salary. On 8 December 1941, the Abwehr Enigma (the German Enigma Machine) message was decoded and read by the team in Bletchley Park by the use of a manuel technique called "rodding" that was identified by Knox. This feat gave an advantage to Britain to plan the D-Day attack.

After the war 

Rock worked for governmental jobs, such as the Government Communications Headquarters until she retired in 1963. Because of the Official Secrets Act 1939, Rock never spoke about her work to anyone. Even late in her life and Bletchley Park and codebreaking was circulating the news, she would not comment about her contribution to the Colossus. On 26 August 1983 she died in Ronkswood Hospital, Worcester.

References

British cryptographers
Bletchley Park people
1903 births
1983 deaths
Bletchley Park women
People from Hammersmith
People educated at Portsmouth High School (Southsea)
Members of the Order of the British Empire